Leonardo Balada Ibáñez (born September 22, 1933) is a Catalan American classical composer, who is noted for his operas and orchestral works.

Life 
Balada was born in Barcelona, Spain. After studying piano at the Conservatori Superior de Música del Liceu in Barcelona, Balada emigrated to the United States in 1956 to study at the New York College of Music on scholarship. He left that institution for the Juilliard School in New York, from which he graduated in 1960. He studied composition with Vincent Persichetti, Alexandre Tansman and Aaron Copland, and conducting with Igor Markevitch. In 1981, he became a naturalized citizen of the United States. He taught at Carnegie Mellon University in Pittsburgh, Pennsylvania starting in 1970, and retired in 2020.

Music 
Balada's works from the early 1960s display some of the characteristics of neoclassicism, but he was ultimately dissatisfied with this technique, and in 1966 began to move towards a more avant-garde style, producing works such as Guernica. Balada felt a need for a change again in 1975, his work from then onward being characterized by the combination of folk dance rhythms with the avant-garde techniques of the previous period. Harmonically, Balada's mature period work displays a combination of the tonality of folk music with atonality. Compositions representative of this period include Homage to Sarasate and Homage to Casals. No matter the stylistic phase, Balada's music features extensive rhythmic variance and unique orchestration, often in service of a haunting atmosphere.

Some of Balada's works have been recorded by Naxos Records.

Works

Opera 
Hangman, Hangman!, chamber opera (1982)
Zapata, opera (1984)
Christopher Columbus, opera (1986)
Death of Columbus, opera (1996)
The Town of Greed, chamber opera (1997) (sequel to Hangman, Hangman!)
Faust-bal, opera (2007)
Resurrection of Columbus, opera (2013)

Orchestral 
Symphonies
Symphony No. 1 Sinfonia en Negro, a homage to Martin Luther King (1968)
Symphony No. 2 Cumbres, a short symphony for band (1972)
Symphony No. 3 Steel Symphony (1972)
Symphony No. 4 Lausanne (1992)
Symphony No. 5 American (2003)
Symphony No. 6 Symphony of Sorrows (2005)
Guernica (1966)
Homage to Sarasate (1975)
Homage to Casals (1975)
Sardana (1979)
Quasi un Pasodoble (1981)
Fantasias Sonoras (1987)
Zapata: Images for Orchestra (1987)
Columbus: Images for Orchestra (1991)
Divertimentos, for string orchestra (1991)
Celebracio (1992)
Folk Dreams (1994-8)
Passacaglia (2002)
Prague Sinfonietta (2003)

Concertante 
Piano
Piano Concerto No. 1 (1964)
Piano Concerto No. 2 for piano, winds, and percussion (1974)
Piano Concerto No. 3 (1999)

Violin
Violin Concerto No. 1 (1982)
Caprichos No. 2 (2004)
Caprichos No. 3 (2005)

Viola
Viola Concerto for viola and wind ensemble (2009–2010)

Cello
Cello Concerto No. 1 for cello and nine players (1962)
Cello Concerto No. 2 New Orleans (2001)
Concerto for Three Cellos and Orchestra A German Concerto (2006)

Flute
Morning Music for flute and orchestra (1994)
Music for Flute and Orchestra (2000)

Clarinet
Caprichos No. 7 (2009), Composed for and dedicated to Grup21; Peter Bacchus, artistic director - for clarinet and instrumental ensemble.

Guitar
Guitar Concerto No. 1 (1965)
Sinfonia Concertante for Guitar and Orchestra Persistencies (1974)
Concerto for Four Guitars and Orchestra (1976)
Concierto Mágico for guitar and orchestra (1997)
Caprichos No. 1 (2003)

Others
Concerto for Bandoneon and Orchestra (1970)
Concertino for Castanets and Orchestra Three Anecdotes (1977)
Music for Oboe and Orchestra Lament from the Cradle of the Earth (1993)
Double Concerto for Oboe, Clarinet and Orchestra (2010)

Vocal/choral 
Maria Sabina (1969)
La Moradas (1970)
No-res (1974)
Ponce de Leon, for narrator and orchestra (1974)
Torquemada (1980)
Thunderous Scenes (1992)
Dionisio: In Memoriam (2001)
Ebony Fantasies, cantata (2003)

References

External links 
Leonardo Balada's website with Carnegie Mellon University
Art of the States: Leonardo Balada
Interview with Leonardo Balada, April 19, 1998

1933 births
20th-century classical composers
20th-century Spanish musicians
21st-century American composers
21st-century American male musicians
21st-century classical composers
21st-century Spanish musicians
American classical composers
American male classical composers
American people of Catalan descent
Carnegie Mellon University faculty
Composers from Catalonia
Opera composers from Catalonia
Conservatori Superior de Música del Liceu alumni
Juilliard School alumni
Living people
New York College of Music alumni
Pupils of Vincent Persichetti
Spanish classical composers
Spanish emigrants to the United States
Spanish male classical composers
20th-century American composers
20th-century American male musicians